Andriano is a surname. Notable people with the surname include:

Dan Andriano (born 1977), American singer, songwriter, and musician 
Wendi Andriano (born 1970), American prisoner

See also
Andrian (disambiguation)
Adriano
Andriani